Qala i Naw Airport ; is a small airport serving the city of Qala i Naw in Badghis Province, Afghanistan. It is also known as Qala Nau Airport. It previously had scheduled services with the now defunct Pamir Airways. This airport is unique in the fact that the runway was originally a highway utilized when there was no air traffic. The runway lies adjacent to the site of a former Spanish forward operating base (FOB), now transferred to the Afghan government. The airport is mainly used for military purposes, including by the Afghan Air Force (AAF). Qala e Naw Airport has located next to Qala i Naw Airport.

See also
List of airports in Afghanistan

References

External links 
 Airport record for Qala-I-Naw Airport at Landings.com.

Airports in Afghanistan
Badghis Province